The 1960 British Grand Prix was a Formula One motor race held at the Silverstone Circuit, Northamptonshire, England, on 16 July 1960. It was race 7 of 10 in the 1960 World Championship of Drivers and race 6 of 9 in the 1960 International Cup for Formula One Manufacturers. The race was won by reigning World Champion Jack Brabham and Innes Ireland finished in third place. Between the two, multiple motorcycle Grand Prix World Champion John Surtees (in only his second ever Formula One Grand Prix) took second place.

Classification

Qualifying

Race

* Lance Reventlow and Chuck Daigh were entered with the same vehicle following extensive damage to their Scarab cars at the preceding French Grand Prix. Daigh proved the faster during practice and so Reventlow was withdrawn.

Championship standings after the race

Drivers' Championship standings

Constructors' Championship standings

 Notes: Only the top five positions are included for both sets of standings.

References

External links

 (Race results and statistics.)

British Grand Prix
British Grand Prix
1960 in British motorsport